Photoflood lamps are a type of incandescent light bulb designed for use as a continuous light source for photographic purposes. The filaments of such lamps are operated at much higher temperatures than is the case for standard, general lighting service lamps. The result is a brilliance of light much higher than the lamp's wattage rating would suggest. The trade off is that the lamp has a very short service life of seldom more than ten hours.

Applications

Past 

Photoflood lamps were used by photographers and film makers as a continuous lighting source. However  for photographers, such use has been overtaken by the use of high power studio flash units many of which also provide a lower power light for modelling purposes. Film makers have turned to longer lasting tungsten halogen lamps which, in their turn, are being overtaken by light-emitting diode (LED) lamps.

Present 

Photoflood lamps are still used in special cases by the motion picture industry. Where an illuminated lamp is required on set as part of the dressing, the light fall from a normal light bulb would not be visible on film as it would be swamped by the bright studio lighting. The ordinary lamp is replaced by a photoflood bulb whose intense light is easily visible on film (and if so required, is bright enough that it can form the sole illumination for the shot).

Lamp characteristics 

Photoflood bulbs are available in a number of sizes. The two most common sizes have these characteristics.

Note that in each case an ordinary 100 watt lamp is provided for comparison purposes.

References

Photographic lighting